Helluarchus is a genus of beetles in the family Carabidae, containing the following species:

 Helluarchus robustus Sloane, 1914
 Helluarchus whitei Lea, 1914

References

Anthiinae (beetle)